Mumasy (Multimedia machine information system) is a vendor-neutral markup language for document authoring based on XML, similar to DocBook and DITA.

XML markup languages
Document-centric XML-based standards
Technical communication
Technical communication tools
Software documentation